Neon Future II is the third studio album by American DJ and producer Steve Aoki. It was released on May 12, 2015 through Ultra Records and Dim Mak Records, serving as the sequel to Neon Future I.

Background
The second installment was finished around the same as the first. While Neon Future I contains more party-themed/club-styled songs, Neon Future II is supposed to show a "darker", more "emotional" side of the Neon Future theme.

It was announced to feature collaborations such as Linkin Park, Harrison, Matthew Koma, Tony Junior, Snoop Lion, and many more on the album. The songs with DJ Fresh and Tinie Tempah did not make the final cut of the album.

Commercial performance
The album debuted at No. 2 on Dance/Electronic Albums, and No. 66 on Billboard 200, selling 7,000 copies in its first week.

Singles
The lead single with Moxie Raia, "I Love It When You Cry (Moxoki)", was released January 23, 2015. Ten days after Aoki had already uploaded the radio edit to YouTube, the music video for the single was released on February 24, 2015.

The second single "Darker Than Blood", which features American rock band Linkin Park, was released on April 14, 2015. The song is their second collaboration after "A Light That Never Comes", which was featured on the band's second remix album Recharged. The single was first revealed in an interview with Billboard. It can also be heard on Steve Aoki's official SoundCloud page.

The third single "Lightning Strikes", with NERVO and Tony Junior, was released on May 4, 2015. Steve Aoki released this song early for streaming on his SoundCloud page.

Track listing

Credits and personnel
 Steve Aoki – producer

Additional musicians
 J. J. Abrams – spoken word in "Warp Speed"
 Kip Thorne – spoken word in "TARS"
 Gianni "Luminati" Nicassio – drums, guitar, percussion and ukulele in "Home We'll Go (Take My Hand)"
 Nicholas "RAS" Furlong – backing vocals in "Light Years"

Other personnel
 Brian Roettinger – art direction, design
 Jamie Stuart – art direction, design
 Brian Ziff – photography

Chart history

Release history

References

External links
 Neon Future, Vol. 2 – Steve Aoki | AllMusic
 Neon Future ll by Steve Aoki | SoundCloud

2015 albums
Steve Aoki albums
Electronic dance music albums by American artists